Ryan Christian Anderson (born December 19, 1987) is an American professional basketball player who last played for the Niagara River Lions of the Canadian Elite Basketball League (CEBL). He was a four-year standout player for Nebraska, where he earned a degree in sociology with a minor in music technology.

High school career 
Anderson attended Rainier Beach High School in Seattle, Washington.  When Anderson was a freshman, his team was ranked No. 1 in the state and the country, with the help of Stewart Twins and Nate Robinson, they won the state title. In Anderson's sophomore year, Rainier Beach finished as the state's runners-up and as a junior, he gathered all-conference and all-city accolades. In his final high school season, he averaged 19 points, 9 rebounds, and 7 assists, leading his team to a fourth-place finish at states with a 23–7 record. Anderson also played Amateur Athletic Union (AAU) basketball for the Friends of Hoop in the summer of 2005 with Isaiah Thomas of the Boston Celtics and Spencer Hawes, averaging 12 points, 4 rebounds, and 3 assists. The team reached the semifinals of the Nike Peach Jam and, later in the summer, won the title of the Nike Main Event in Vegas. The win gave them a ticket to participate in the Prep Showcase championship, at which Anderson defeated future NBA MVP Kevin Durant to win the Three-Point Contest.

Personal life 
Ryan was married to the former Danielle Smith (also known as Rene Christian) on August 8, 2009, in his hometown of Seattle. They are pregnant with a baby boy, due November 2019. He is the son of Carla and Paul Anderson, and has four sisters, Taylor, Erin, Deborah and Kela, and a brother, Austin.  Anderson is a musician in his spare time, as he sings, writes, produces and also plays six musical instruments (drums, bass, guitar, sax, piano and keyboards). He has completed work for his first CD, on which he wrote and composed every song. He is also the CEO of his record label VeryTrue records to which he is signed to as an artist and has released his debut album entitled Forever.

References 

1987 births
Living people
American men's basketball players
American expatriate basketball people in Canada
American expatriate basketball people in the Netherlands
Basketball players from Seattle
London Lightning players
Nebraska Cornhuskers men's basketball players
Ottawa SkyHawks players
Shooting guards
Sioux Falls Skyforce players
Windsor Express players
B.S. Leiden players
Niagara River Lions players